Thomas Charlesworth Allsopp (18 December 1880 – 7 March 1919) was an English cricketer and association footballer who played first-class cricket for Leicestershire County Cricket Club and the Marylebone Cricket Club. His highest score of 32 came when playing for Leicestershire in the match against Hampshire. His best bowling of 6/85 came when playing for Leicestershire against London County.

He also played 27 Minor Counties Championship games for Norfolk.

Football career 
Allsopp played as an outside left in the Football League for Leicester Fosse and in the Southern League for Brighton & Hove Albion, Luton Town and Norwich City.

Personal life 
In May 1911, Allsopp took ownership of the Hero of Redan pub on Thorpe Road in Norwich. He served as a sergeant in the Queen's Royal Regiment (West Surrey) and the Labour Corps during the First World War. After returning home from the war, he fell victim to the 1918 flu pandemic and died in Norwich on 7 March 1919. He was buried with military honours in Earlham Road Cemetery in the city.

References

1880 births
1919 deaths
Military personnel from Leicester
English cricketers
Leicestershire cricketers
Cricketers from Leicester
Marylebone Cricket Club cricketers
Norfolk cricketers
English footballers
Association football outside forwards
English Football League players
Southern Football League players
Leicester City F.C. players
Brighton & Hove Albion F.C. players
Luton Town F.C. players
Norwich City F.C. players
Deaths from the Spanish flu pandemic in England
British Army personnel of World War I
Queen's Royal Regiment soldiers
Royal Pioneer Corps soldiers
Footballers from Norwich
Footballers from Leicester
Cricketers from Norwich